Shrewsbury International School Bangkok is a coeducational British international school in Charoeng Krung, Bang Kho Laem District, Bangkok, Thailand. It was established in 2003. It is affiliated with Shrewsbury School in the UK. The school is divided into 3 schools: Pre prep school, Junior school and Senior school, which includes sixth form. The school follows the National Curriculum of England.

History
Shrewsbury International School Bangkok was founded in 2003. The first principal was Stuart Morris who was replaced by Stephen Holroyd, who arrived at Shrewsbury International School Bangkok in 2005. Holroyd worked at Shrewsbury School in the UK for 20 years, first as an English teacher then rising to be Deputy Master before his appointment to Bangkok. After 12 years of service, he became Chief Executive Officer of Shrewsbury International (Asia).

Christopher Seal, the Former Deputy Head (pastoral) of Millfield School in Somerset of UK, then, has held the position since August 2017.

Curriculum
Shrewsbury's curriculum is based around the English National Curriculum. The curriculum provides structured learning from the age of 3 to 18 years. The Early Years Foundation stage (age 3 years) is followed by a sequence of 5 "Key Stages", culminating in the advanced A-level programme (ages 16 – 18).

Tuition
Yearly tuition fees for the 2017-2018 school year range from 534,300 to 950,700 baht depending on grade level.

Facilities
Facilities at Shrewsbury include:

 Library, with 40,000 books, CDs & DVDS (plus thousands more via online catalogue), separate junior and senior sections with study spaces and makerspace wall. 
 Sixth Form Centre
 Auditorium called the Khunying Sumanee Memorial Hall, seating 5,800 people
 A Recital Hall located in the Music Department
 Music School 
 Learning support zone 
 Junior innovation centre 
 A professional dance studio 
 Interactive white boards in every classroom
 Fully equipped computer suites (Apple Mac and PC)
 Three gymnasiums
 Gymnastics hall 
 Three tennis courts
 Two sports fields (one with running track)
 Three outdoor playgrounds
 Climbing 
 Aquatics centre – including learners’ pool, junior pool (also used for water polo) and championship pool with electronic racing blocks and scoreboard
 Two dining room/canteen 
 Indoor running track

Student body
As of 2017 the school had 1,600 students. About 70 percent were Thai. United Kingdom students were the second largest group of students.

Awards
Winner of 2019 International School Awards ‘Outstanding Initiative that Supports Students’ Pathways to Higher Education’.

Notable alumni
Chittaphon Leechaiyapornkul (Ten), member of NCT, WayV and SuperM
Myra Molloy (Myra), The winner of Thailand's Got Talent (season 1)
Pangina Heals (drag queen), host of Drag Race Thailand

Accreditations
The school is accredited by the Council for International Schools and ONESQA. It is also affiliated to the Federation of British International Schools in Asia (FOBISIA) and is a member of the Headmasters’ and Headmistresses’ Conference (HMC).

References

External links

Shrewsbury International School Bangkok (official website)

Educational institutions established in 2003
International schools in Bangkok
2003 establishments in Thailand
British international schools in Thailand
Private schools in Thailand
Buildings and structures on the Chao Phraya River